is a passenger railway station located in the town of Itano, Itano District, Tokushima Prefecture, Japan. It is operated by JR Shikoku and has the station number "T06".

Lines
Awa-Kawabata Station is served by the JR Shikoku Kōtoku Line and is located 59.8 km from the beginning of the line at Takamatsu. Only local services stop at the station.

Layout
The station consists of a side platform serving a single track. The station building is unstaffed and serves only as a waiting room.

History
Awa-Kawabata Station was opened by the privately run Awa Railway as Kawabata Stop on 15 July 1927. After the Awa Railway was nationalized on 1 July 1933, Japanese Government Railways (JGR) took over control of the station. It was renamed Awa-Kawabata Station and was operated as part of the Awa Line. On 20 March 1935, the station became part of the Kōtoku Main Line.  With the privatization of JNR (the successor of JGR) on 1 April 1987, control of the station passed to JR Shikoku.

Passenger statistics
In fiscal 2019, the station was used by an average of 154 passengers daily

Surrounding area
Takamatsu Expressway Itano Interchange
Kawabata Community Center
Gokuraku-ji

See also
List of railway stations in Japan

References

External links

 JR Shikoku timetable

Railway stations in Tokushima Prefecture
Railway stations in Japan opened in 1927
Itano, Tokushima